is a Japanese women's professional shogi player ranked 1-dan.

Promotion history
Yorimoto's promotion history is as follows:

 2-kyū: February 1, 2017
 1-kyū: March 15, 2017
 1-dan: April 1, 2019

Note: All ranks are women's professional ranks.

References

External links
 ShogiHub: Yorimoto, Nana

1997 births
Living people
People from Meguro
Japanese shogi players
Women's professional shogi players
Professional shogi players from Tokyo Metropolis